Joshua Ashley Sampo (born July 24, 1984) is an American mixed martial artist who most recently competed in Ultimate Fighting Championship's flyweight division.

Mixed martial arts career

Early career
Sampo started his professional career in 2009. He fought mainly for Missouri-based promotions as Fight Me MMA, Wright Fights and Rumble Time Promotions. He is now a seventh grade teacher at Hardin Middle School in St. Charles.

Legacy Fighting Championship
Sampo was expected to face Rafael de Freitas on September 14, 2012 at Legacy FC 14. However, instead he faced Antonio Banuelos. He won via unanimous decision (30–27, 30–27, 30–27) .

Championship Fighting Alliance
Sampo faced Olympic medallist and Bellator MMA veteran Alexis Vila on January 19, 2013 at CFA 9: Night of Champions for the inaugural flyweight title. Sampo defeated Vila via submission due to a guillotine choke in the fifth round and became the CFA flyweight champion.

Sampo defended his title once against Sam Thao on October 12, 2013 at CFA 12: Sampo vs. Thao. He won via unanimous decision (49–46, 49–46, 49–46) after five rounds.

In November 2013, it was announced that Sampo had signed with the UFC.

Ultimate Fighting Championship
Sampo made his promotional debut against fellow newcomer Ryan Benoit on November 30, 2013 at The Ultimate Fighter 18 Finale. Sampo won via submission due to a rear-naked choke and the performance earned both participants Fight of the Night honors, but Sampo was not eligible for the bonus due to missing weight.

Sampo faced Zach Makovsky on February 22, 2014 at UFC 170. Sampo had his first octagon defeat via unanimous decision (30–27, 30–27, 29–28).

Sampo faced promotional newcomer Paddy Holohan on July 19, 2014 at UFC Fight Night: McGregor vs. Brandao. He lost via submission due to a rear-naked choke in the first round.

Sampo faced Justin Scoggins on May 23, 2015 at UFC 187.  Sampo lost the fight via unanimous decision.  Subsequently, he was released from the promotion.

Bellator MMA
Sampo faced Dominic Mazzotta at Bellator 197 on April 13, 2018. He lost the fight by unanimous decision.

Championships and accomplishments

Mixed martial arts
 Ultimate Fighting Championship
 Fight of the Night (one time) vs. Ryan Benoit
 Championship Fighting Alliance
 CFA flyweight title (one time)
 One successful title defense
 Cage Championships
 CC amateur bantamweight title (one time)

Amateur wrestling
 National Association of Intercollegiate Athletics
 NAIA Wrestling National Championship All-American out of Lindenwood University (2005, 2006, 2007)
 NAIA Wrestling National Championship 125 lb: Fourth place out of Lindenwood University (2006)
 NAIA Wrestling National Championship 125 lb: Fifth place out of Lindenwood University (2005, 2007)
 Nevada Interscholastic Activities Association
 Nevada State High School Wrestling 112 lb: Champion out of Pahranagat Valley High School (2002)
 Nevada State High School Wrestling 103 lb: Champion out of Pahranagat Valley High School (2001)

Mixed martial arts record

|-
|Loss
|align=center | 11–6
|Dominic Mazzotta	
|Decision (unanimous)
|Bellator 197
|
|align=center|3
|align=center|5:00
|St. Charles, Missouri, United States
|
|-
| Loss
| align=center | 11–5
| Justin Scoggins
| Decision (unanimous)
| UFC 187
| 
| align=center | 3
| align=center | 5:00
| Las Vegas, Nevada, United States
|
|-
| Loss
| align=center | 11–4
| Paddy Holohan
| Submission (rear-naked choke)
| UFC Fight Night: McGregor vs. Brandao
| 
| align=center | 1
| align=center | 3:06
| Dublin, Ireland
|
|-
| Loss
| align=center | 11–3
| Zach Makovsky
| Decision (unanimous)
| UFC 170
| 
| align=center | 3
| align=center | 5:00
| Las Vegas, Nevada, United States
|
|-
| Win
| align=center | 11–2
| Ryan Benoit
| Submission (rear-naked choke)
| The Ultimate Fighter 18 Finale
| 
| align=center | 2
| align=center | 4:31
| Las Vegas, Nevada, United States
| 
|-
| Win
| align=center | 10–2
| Sam Thao
| Decision (unanimous)
| CFA 12: Sampo vs. Thao
| 
| align=center | 5
| align=center | 5:00
| Coral Gables, Florida, United States
| 
|-
| Win
| align=center | 9–2
| Alexis Vila
| Submission (guillotine choke)
| CFA 9: Night of Champions
| 
| align=center | 5
| align=center | 2:26
| Coral Gables, Florida, United States
| 
|-
| Win
| align=center | 8–2
| Antonio Banuelos
| Decision (unanimous)
| Legacy FC 14
| 
| align=center | 3
| align=center | 5:00
| Houston, Texas, United States
|
|-
| Win
| align=center | 7–2
| Carson Gainey
| Submission (kimura)
| Rumble Time Promotions: Clash of the Warriors
| 
| align=center | 1
| align=center | 1:23
| St. Charles, Missouri, United States
|
|-
| Loss
| align=center | 6–2
| Will Campuzano
| KO (knee)
| Rumble Time Promotions
| 
| align=center | 3
| align=center | 1:18
| St. Charles, Missouri, United States
|
|-
| Win
| align=center | 6–1
| Czar Sklavos
| Decision (unanimous)
| Fight Me MMA
| 
| align=center | 3
| align=center | 5:00
| St. Charles, Missouri, United States
|
|-
| Win
| align=center | 5–1
| Gor Mnatsakanyan
| Decision (unanimous)
| UFF: X
| 
| align=center | 3
| align=center | 5:00
| Salina, Kansas, United States
|
|-
| Win
| align=center | 4–1
| Jeremy Freeman
| Submission (leg triangle)
| Wright Fights 4
| 
| align=center | 1
| align=center | 3:12
| St. Charles, Missouri, United States
|
|-
| Loss
| align=center | 3–1
| Mike French
| Decision (unanimous)
| Wright Fights 2
| 
| align=center | 3
| align=center | 5:00
| St. Charles, Missouri, United States
|
|-
| Win
| align=center | 3–0
| Eric Acuna
| Decision (unanimous)
| Fight Me MMA 1: The Battle Begins
| 
| align=center | 3
| align=center | 5:00
| St. Charles, Missouri, United States
|
|-
| Win
| align=center | 2–0
| Jake Rosenbaum
| Submission (rear-naked choke)
| Hoosier FC 4: Showdown at the Steel Yard
| 
| align=center | 3
| align=center | 0:57
| Gary, Indiana, United States
|
|-
| Win
| align=center | 1–0
| Josh Phillips
| Submission (rear-naked choke)
| Friday Night Fight Night
| 
| align=center | 1
| align=center | 4:35
| Sedalia, Missouri, United States
|

Mixed martial arts amateur record

|-
| Win
| align=center | 4–0
| Chris Butler
| TKO (strikes)
| Xtreme Fight League
| 
| align=center | 1
| align=center | 1:17
| St. Louis, Missouri, United States
|
|-
| Win
| align=center | 3–0
| Albert Mendoza
| Submission (strikes)
| Cage Championships 16
| 
| align=center | 2
| align=center | 1:29
| Sullivan, Missouri, United States
| 
|-
| Win
| align=center | 2–0
| Robert Peralez
| N/A
| Midwest Fight League: Battle at the Bluenote 6
| 
| align=center | N/A
| align=center | N/A
| Columbia, Missouri, United States
|
|-
| Win
| align=center | 1–0
| Jon Hollis
| TKO
| Midwest Fight Fest
| 
| align=center | 1
| align=center | N/A
| St. Louis, Missouri, United States
|

See also
 List of current UFC fighters
 List of male mixed martial artists

References

External links
 
 

1984 births
Living people
American male mixed martial artists
Mixed martial artists from Nevada
Flyweight mixed martial artists
Bantamweight mixed martial artists
Mixed martial artists utilizing collegiate wrestling
Mixed martial artists utilizing Brazilian jiu-jitsu
Ultimate Fighting Championship male fighters
American male sport wrestlers
Amateur wrestlers
American practitioners of Brazilian jiu-jitsu
Sportspeople from the Las Vegas Valley